Goette or Götte is a German language surname from the personal name Gothard. Notable people with the name include:
 Alexander Goette (1840–1922), German zoologist
 Barbara Goette (1908–1997), German academic
 Hans Rupprecht Goette (1956), German classical archaeologist
 Jeannette Götte (1979), German former football midfielder

See also 
 Goedde

References 

German-language surnames
Surnames from given names